Gorze is a commune in the Moselle department in Grand Est in north-eastern France.

Sites and monuments
Gorze Abbey was confiscated as public property during the French Revolution; it has since been restored and utilised for a variety of public uses.

See also
 Communes of the Moselle department
 Parc naturel régional de Lorraine

References

External links
 

Communes of Moselle (department)